Aristotelia oribatis is a moth of the family Gelechiidae. It was described by Edward Meyrick in 1917. It is found in Peru.

The wingspan is about 14 mm. The forewings are blackish fuscous with a suffused brownish-ochreous streak along the dorsum from the base to the apex, occupying about one-third of the wing, partially confluent with a brownish-ochreous longitudinal streak above it from before the middle to three-fourths, which is partially edged with white above. There is an oblique white bar from the costa at one-fifth, almost reaching the dorsal streak, and a similar inwardly oblique white bar from the costa at four-fifths. There is also a white apical dot. The hindwings are light violet grey.

References

Moths described in 1917
Aristotelia (moth)
Moths of South America